The duduk or tsiranapogh (meaning “apricot-made wind instrument”), is an ancient Armenian double reed woodwind instrument made of apricot wood. It is indigenous to Armenia. Variations of the Armenian duduk appear throughout the Caucasus and the Middle East, including Azerbaijan, Georgia, Russia, Turkey, and Iran. Duduk, Balaban, and Mey are almost identical, except for historical and geographical differences.

It is commonly played in pairs: while the first player plays the melody, the second plays a steady drone called dum, and the sound of the two instruments together creates a richer, more haunting sound. The unflattened reed and cylindrical body produce a sound closer to the English horn than the oboe or bassoon. Unlike other double reed instruments like the oboe or shawm, the duduk has a very large reed proportional to its size.

UNESCO proclaimed the Armenian duduk and its music as a Masterpiece of the Intangible Heritage of Humanity in 2005 and inscribed it in 2008. Duduk music has been used in a number of films, most notably in The Russia House and Gladiator.

Etymology

The word düdük is of Turkish origin (Ottoman Turkish: دودوك düdük), itself derived from Turkic tütek. Both Музыкальные инструменты. Энциклопедия and Musical Instruments, A Comprehensive Dictionary give an ultimate origin as Persian, the work tutak. In Armenia, the instrument is also known as tsiranapogh (ծիրանափող).

This instrument is not to be confused with the northwestern Bulgarian folk instrument of the same name (see below, Balkan duduk). Similar instruments used in other parts of Western Asia are the mey and balaban.

Overview

The duduk is a double reed instrument with ancient origins, having existed since at least the fifth century, while there are Armenian scholars who believe it existed more than 1,500 years before that. The earliest instruments similar to the duduk's present form are made of bone or entirely of cane. Today, the duduk is exclusively made of wood with a large double reed, with the body made from aged apricot wood.

The particular tuning depends heavily on the region in which it is played. In the twentieth century, the Armenian duduk began to be standardized diatonic in scale and single-octave in range. Accidentals, or chromatics are achieved using fingering techniques. The instrument's body also has different lengths depending upon the range of the instrument and region. The reed (Armenian: եղեգն, eġegn), is made from one or two pieces of cane in a duck-bill type assembly.  Unlike other double-reed instruments, the reed is quite wide, helping to give the duduk both its unique, mournful sound, as well as its remarkable breathing requirements. The duduk player is called dudukahar (դուդուկահար) in Armenian.

The performers use air stored in their cheeks to keep playing the instrument while they inhale air into their lungs. This "circular" breathing technique is commonly used with all the double-reed instruments in the Middle East.

Duduk "is invariably played with the accompaniment of a second dum duduk, which gives the music an energy and tonic atmosphere, changing the scale harmoniously with the principal duduk."

History
Armenian musicologists cite evidence of the duduk's use as early as 1200 BC, though Western scholars suggest it is 1,500 years old. Variants of the duduk can be found in Armenia and the Caucasus. The history of the Armenian duduk music is dated to the reign of the Armenian king Tigran the Great, who reigned from 95 to 55 B.C. According to ethnomusicologist Dr. Jonathan McCollum, the instrument is depicted in numerous Armenian manuscripts of the Middle Ages, and is "actually the only truly Armenian instrument that's survived through history, and as such is a symbol of Armenian national identity ... The most important quality of the duduk is its ability to express the language dialectic and mood of the Armenian language, which is often the most challenging quality to a duduk player."

Balkan duduk
While "duduk" most commonly refers to the double reed instrument described on this page, by coincidence there is a different instrument of the same name played in northwestern Bulgaria. This is a blocked-end flute resembling the Serbian frula, known also as kaval or kavalče in a part of Macedonia, and as duduk (дудук) in northwest Bulgaria. The blocked end is flat.

In popular culture

The sound of the duduk has become known to wider audiences through its use in popular film soundtracks. Starting with Peter Gabriel's score for Martin Scorsese's The Last Temptation of Christ, the duduk's archaic and mournful sound has been employed in a variety of genres to depict such moods. Djivan Gasparyan played the duduk in Gladiator, Syriana, and Blood Diamond, among others. It was also used extensively in Battlestar Galactica. In the TV series Avatar: The Last Airbender,  its computer-altered sound was given to the fictitious Tsungi horn, most notably played by Iroh and often being featured in the show's soundtrack. With many of the members who worked on ATLA now working on The Dragon Prince, the duduk regularly appears in its soundtrack as well. The sound of the duduk was also used in The Chronicles of Narnia: The Lion, the Witch and the Wardrobe for a lullaby which Mr. Tumnus plays on a fictitious double flute and in the theme song of the Dothraki clan during the TV adaptation Game of Thrones.

Armenia's entry in the 2010 Eurovision Song Contest, "Apricot Stone," featured Armenian musician Djivan Gasparyan playing the duduk.

Film soundtracks
The duduk has been used in a number of films, especially "to denote otherworldliness, loneliness, and mourning or to supply a Middle Eastern/Central Asian atmosphere".
 Ararat (2002) by Mychael Danna
 Avatar (2009) by James Horner, in the track Shutting Down Grace's Lab
 Bedtime Stories (2008) by Rupert Gregson-Williams
 Brotherhood of the Wolf (2001) by Joseph LoDuca
 Chilean Gothic (2000) by Fractal
 Constantine (2005) by Brian Tyler, Klaus Badelt, in the track Circle of Hell
 The Crow (1994) by Graeme Revell featuring the duduk player Djivan Gasparyan
 Dead Man Walking (1995) by David Robbins
 Elektra (2005) by Christophe Beck
 Dune (2021) by Pedro Eustache 
 Gladiator (2000) by Djivan Gasparyan in the track Duduk of the North
 Hotel Rwanda (2004) main theme music
 Hulk (2003) duduk by Pedro Eustache by Danny Elfman 
 The Island (2005) by Steve Jablonsky
 The Kite Runner (2007) by Alberto Iglesias
 The Last Temptation of Christ (1988) by Peter Gabriel, featuring the duduk player Vatche Hovsepian
 The Lion, the Witch and the Wardrobe (2005) by Harry Gregson-Williams, in the track A Narnia Lullaby
 Munich duduk by Pedro Eustache  (2005) by John Williams
 Mayrig (1991) by Omar Al Sharif
 Next (2007) by Mark Isham
 The Passion of The Christ (2004) by Mel Gibson, composer John Debney duduks by Pedro Eustache and Chris Bleth
 Pirates of the Caribbean: At World's End (2007) by Hans Zimmer
 Rendition  (2007) by Paul Hepker and Mark Kilian, duduk by Pedro Eustache 
 Ronin (1998) by Elia Cmiral, duduk by Albert Vardanyan
 Syriana  (2005) by Alexandre Desplat, duduks by Djivan Gasparyan and Pedro Eustache 
 The Russia House (1990) by Jerry Goldsmith
 The Siege  (1998) by Graeme Revell, in the track Torture
 Vantage Point (2008) by Atli Orvarsson
 Wanted (2008) by Danny Elfman
 Warriors of Heaven and Earth (2003) by A. R. Rahman
 You Don't Mess with the Zohan (2008) by Rupert Gregson-Williams
 Beasts in Our Time and Under The Eye Of The Sun played by Rob Townsend on Steve Hackett's album At The Edge Of Light 
 3 Faces (2018) by Jafar Panahi, duduk by Yusef Moharamian

Television soundtracks
 Angel by Rob Kral
 Battlestar Galactica (2004 TV series) by Bear McCreary. Its tracks "Two Funerals", "Starbuck on the Red Moon", "Escape from the Farm", "Colonial Anthem, "Black Market", "Something Dark is Coming", "Martial Law", "Prelude to War" feature the duduk. Roslin's theme was set to lyrics a second time for the third-season premiere "Occupation", this time in Armenian.
 Buffy the Vampire Slayer by Christophe Beck, Tomas Wanker, Rob Dunkin, Douglas Stevens
 Castle by Robert Duncan
 Children of Dune by Brian Tyler in the tracks "Dune Messiah", "The Throne of Alia", "The Preacher At Arrakeen", "Farewell"
 Cold Case by Michael A. Levine
 CSI: New York by Bill Brown
 Firefly by Greg Edmonson
 Game of Thrones by Ramin Djawadi features the instrument in Daenerys Targaryen's theme
 JAG by Steve Bramson
 The Mummy Who Would Be King by Gil Talmi, Andrew Gross
 Over There by Ed Rogers
 The Pacific by Blake Neely and Geoff Zanelli
 Path to 9/11 by John Cameron
 Rome by Jeff Beal
The Dragon Prince by Frederik Wiedmann
 Spartacus by Randy Miller. Track Second Thought
 Star Trek: Enterprise by Paul Baillargeon
 Yu-Gi-Oh! by Wayne Sharpe 
 Xena: Warrior Princess by Joseph Loduca
 The Lord of the Rings: The Rings of Power by Bear McCreary features this instrument in settings of the Númenor theme.

Video game scores
 Shards of the Exodar in World of Warcraft: The Burning Crusade by Derek Duke, Glenn Stafford and Russell Brower
 Dalaran in World of Warcraft: Wrath of the Lich King by Derek Duke, Glenn Stafford and Russell Brower
 Orsis in Hearthstone: League of Explorers
 Civilization V by Michael Curran
 Crimson Dragon by Saori Kobayashi and Jeremy Garren
 Dark Void by Bear McCreary
 Dota 2 by Jason Hayes
 F.E.A.R. by Nathan Grigg
 God of War III by Gerard Marino
 Mass Effect by Jack Wall
 Myst III: Exile by Jack Wall
 Myst IV: Revelation by Jack Wall
 Outcast by Lennie Moore in the track Oriental Spirit
 Prince of Persia: The Two Thrones by Inon Zur
 Uncharted 2 by Greg Edmonson
 Croft Manor Theme in Tomb Raider Legend by Troels Brun Folmann
 The Elder Scrolls V: Skyrim (2011) by Jeremy Soule in the track Tundra
 Total War: Rome II by Richard Beddow
 Empire: Total War
 Metro Exodus by Oleksii Omelchuk

Popular music

"Come Talk to Me" by Peter Gabriel (from the 1992 album Us)
"Zachem Ya" by t.A.T.u. (from the 2001 album 200 Po Vstrechnoy)
"Prelude & Nostalgia" by Yanni (from the 1997 album Tribute)
"Prelude & Nostalgia" by Yanni (from the 2006 album Yanni Live! The Concert Event)
"Science" and "Arto" (Hidden Track) by System of a Down (from the 2001 album Toxicity)
"Jenny Wren" (2005) and "Back in Brazil" (2018) by Paul McCartney
"All That I Am" by Rob Thomas (from the 2006 album ...Something to Be)
"Touching the Void" by Soulfly (from the 2008 album Conquer)
"Qélé, Qélé" by Sirusho (from the 2008 Eurovision Song Contest Armenian entry)
"1944" by Jamala (2015)
"Soulfly X" by Soulfly (from the 2015 album Archangel)
"Come Along" by Cosmo Sheldrake (from the 2017 album "The Much Much How How and I", and featured in advertisements for Apple's iPhone XR in the UK, USA, and Canada)
"Meeting" album by A.G.A. Trio with Arsen Petrosyan on Duduk (2020 by NAXOS WORLD)

Anime soundtracks
 Tales from Earthsea by Tamiya Terashima, in the tracks "The Trip", "The Spider" and "Violent Robbery/The Seduction of the Undead".

See also

 Music of Armenia
 Aulos
 Shvi
 Mey (instrument)
 Zurna
 Sring

References

Further reading

Single oboes with cylindrical bore
Armenian inventions
Armenian musical instruments
Musical instruments of Georgia (country)
Masterpieces of the Oral and Intangible Heritage of Humanity